Go-eun is a Korean feminine given name. Its meaning differs based on the hanja used to write each syllable of the name. There are 67 hanja with the reading "go" and 30 hanja with the reading "eun" on the South Korean government's official list of hanja which may be registered for use in given names. It also means "beautiful, pretty, fine, soft" including "go-un" which is an adjective of "gop-da" in Korean.

People
People with this name include:

Han Go-eun (born 1975), South Korean actress
Byul (born Kim Go-eun, 1983), South Korean singer
Kim Go-eun (born 1991), South Korean actress
Yeum Go-eun (born 1994), South Korean long-distance runner
Lee Go-eun (born 2009), South Korean actress

Fictional characters
Fictional characters with this name include:

Seo Go-eun, in the 2010 South Korean film Wedding Dress
Lee Go-eun, in the 2012 South Korean television series The King of Dramas

See also
List of Korean given names

References

Korean feminine given names